Xaaxkax (also known as Yaaxbax) is a populated place in the Quintana Roo state of Mexico.

References

Populated places in Quintana Roo